Mohammed el-Kurd (born 15 May 1998) is a Palestinian writer and poet. He is currently based out of Sheikh Jarrah in East Jerusalem. Prior to the 2021 Israel–Palestine crisis, he was pursuing a master's degree in the United States, but returned to protest Israel's eviction of Palestinians from their homes in East Jerusalem (see Sheikh Jarrah controversy). He has gained prominence for his description of Palestinians' lives in the Israeli-occupied West Bank; el-Kurd has referred to the evictions as a form of ethnic cleansing, and has also accused Israel of imposing apartheid-style laws and regulations onto Palestinians in the occupied territories.

Early life and education 
El-Kurd was born into a family of Palestinian Muslims in the neighbourhood of Sheikh Jarrah, East Jerusalem, on 15 May 1998. In 2009, part of his family's home in Sheikh Jarrah was seized by Israeli settlers. He was the main subject of the 2013 documentary film My Neighbourhood by Julia Bacha and Rebekah Wingert-Jabi. He had emigrated to the United States and settled in New York to pursue higher education, but returned to East Jerusalem during the 2021 Israel–Palestine crisis.

Return to East Jerusalem (2021) 

Since his return to the Israeli-occupied West Bank amidst the Sheikh Jarrah controversy, El-Kurd has been documenting and speaking out against Palestinian displacement in East Jerusalem. He and his twin sister, Muna el-Kurd, began campaigning to raise global awareness on Israeli policies in East Jerusalem through various social media channels. In combination, the twins have amassed hundreds of thousands of followers on Twitter and millions of followers on Instagram. While Muna's posts are usually in Arabic, Mohammed frequently posts in English to cater to a Western audience.

On 6 June 2021, Mohammed and Muna were both detained by Israel Police; they were later released on the same day after being detained for several hours. During the 2021 Israel–Palestine crisis, Mohammed appeared on American television channels CNN, MSNBC, and CBSN.

In 2021, Mohammed and Muna were named on TIME 100.

El-Kurd's Tweets in which he accused Israelis of eating the organs of Palestinians and of having a particular lust for Palestinian blood have drawn criticism for reviving the blood libel accusation. He has equated Israelis with Nazis and accused them of "kristallnachting" Palestinians. These and other Tweets have led several authors and sponsors to withdraw from the 2023 Adelaide Writers' Week.

Published works 
Since 2021, el-Kurd has been the Palestine correspondent for The Nation.

His poetry and articles are in English, written on the themes of dispossession, ethnic cleansing, systemic and structural violence, settler colonialism, Islamophobia, and gender roles.

Examples of his work include:

 "Dear President Obama ... I hope you won't remain silent" (The Guardian, 2013);
 "Palestinian women: An untold history of leadership and resistance" (Al Jazeera, 2018);
 "My Grandmother, Icon of Palestinian Resilience" (The Nation, 2020);
 "Tomorrow My Family and Neighbors May Be Forced from Our Homes by Israeli Settlers" (The Nation, 2020);
 "Why are Palestinians being forced to prove their humanity?" (+972 Magazine, 2020);
 "If they steal Sheikh Jarrah" (Mada Masr, 2021);
 "The Israeli Military Shot My Cousin—and the US Bears Part of the Blame" (The Nation, 2021);
Rifqa, poetry collection (Haymarket Books, 2021).

References 

1998 births
21st-century Palestinian poets
Palestinian activists
Social media influencers
Writers from Jerusalem
Living people
Palestinian poets